The Department of Food and Drug Administration (abbreviated FDA) is Burma's food safety regulatory body, which oversees the safety and quality of food, drugs, medical devices and cosmetics. FDA was established in 1995. The agency was established under the 1992 National Drug Law, which also established the Food and Drug Board of Authority, which regulates and controls the manufacture, import, export, storage,
distribution and sale of food and drugs, in the interests of public safety.

See also
Ministry of Health (Burma)

References

Medical and health organisations based in Myanmar
Drugs in Myanmar
National agencies for drug regulation
Food safety organizations
Government agencies established in 1995
Regulation in Myanmar